The  Budhabalanga River (ବୁଢାବଳଙ୍ଗ ନଦୀ) (also called Balanga River) flows through the districts of Mayurbhanj and Balasore  in the Indian state of Odisha.

Course
The Budhabalanga, meaning old Balanga, rises in the Similipal hills and plunges through Barehipani Falls, the second-highest waterfall in India, located in Simlipal National Park. It then flows in a northerly direction up to the village Karanjiapal in Bangiriposi police-station. Thereafter, it turns to the north-east and flows along the railway track up to the village Jhankapahadi. There it changes its course to the south and meets the Katra nala. The other tributaries are the Palpala and the Chipat both of which are hill streams rising from the Similipal hills. Then the river passes through Baripada. It later flows through Balasore district and into the Bay of Bengal.

River data
Its major tributaries are the Sone, the Gangadhar, and the Catra.

References 

Rivers of Odisha
Rivers of India